Steve Hmiel (born c. 1938) was a Canadian football player who played for the Hamilton Tiger-Cats. He won the Grey Cup with them in 1965.

References

1930s births
Sportspeople from Hamilton, Ontario
Players of Canadian football from Ontario
Hamilton Tiger-Cats players
Living people